Point-blank range is any distance over which a certain firearm can hit a target without the need to compensate for bullet drop, and can be adjusted over a wide range of distances by sighting in the firearm. If the bullet leaves the barrel parallel to the sight, the bullet, like any object in flight, is pulled downwards by gravity, so for distant targets, the shooter must point the firearm above the target to compensate. But if the target is close enough, bullet drop will be negligible so the shooter can aim the gun straight at the target. If the sights are set so that the barrel has a small upward tilt, the bullet starts by rising and later drops. This results in a weapon that hits too low for very close targets, too high for intermediate targets, too low for very far targets, and point blank at two distances in between.  For a .270 Winchester, as an example, the bullet first crosses the line of sight at about 23 metres (25 yards) as it is rising and has a maximum impact above the line of sight of approximately 75 mm (3 inches) and crosses the line of sight again at about 250 metres (275 yards).  This is for a 130 grain hunting bullet.  Therefore point blank range for a deer size target is about 275 metres (300-310 yards).
Point-blank range will vary by a weapon's external ballistics characteristics and the allowable error at the target; the flatter the bullet's trajectory or the larger the target, the longer the point-blank range will be.

In popular usage, point-blank range has come to mean extremely close range with a firearm, yet not close enough to be a contact shot.

History
It is thought the word blanc may be used to describe a small white aiming spot formerly at the center of shooting targets. However, since none of the early sources mention a white center target, blanc may refer to empty space or zero point of elevation when testing range. Point-blank range denotes the distance a marksman can expect to fire a specific weapon and hit a desired target without adjusting its sights. If a weapon is sighted correctly and ammunition reliable, the same spot should be hit every time at point-blank range.

The term originated with the techniques used to aim muzzle-loading cannon.  Their barrels tapered from breech to muzzle, so that when the top of the cannon was held horizontal, its bore actually sat at an elevated angle. This caused the projectile to rise above the natural line of sight shortly after leaving the muzzle, then drop below it after the apex of its slightly parabolic trajectory was reached.

By repeatedly firing a given projectile with the same charge, the point where the shot fell below the bottom of the bore could be measured.  This distance was considered the point-blank range: any target within it required the gun to be depressed; any beyond it required elevation, up to the angle of greatest range at somewhat before 45 degrees.

Small arms

Maximum point-blank range

Small arms are often sighted in so that their sight line and bullet path are within a certain acceptable margin out to the longest possible range, called the maximum point-blank range. Maximum point-blank range is principally a function of a cartridge's external ballistics and target size: high-velocity rounds have long point-blank ranges, while slow rounds have much shorter point-blank ranges. Target size determines how far above and below the line of sight a projectile's trajectory may deviate. Other considerations include sight height and acceptable drop before a shot is ineffective.

Hunting
A large target, like the vitals area of a deer, allows a deviation of a few inches (as much as 10 cm) while still ensuring a quickly disabling hit. Vermin such as prairie dogs require a much smaller deviation, less than an inch (about 2 cm). The height of the sights has two effects on point blank range. If the sights are lower than the allowable deviation, then point blank range starts at the muzzle, and any difference between the sight height and the allowable deviation is lost distance that could have been in point blank range.  Higher sights, up to the maximum allowable deviation, push the maximum point blank range further from the gun. Sights that are higher than the maximum allowable deviation push the start of the point blank range farther out from the muzzle; this is common with varmint rifles, where close shots are only sometimes made, as it places the point blank range out to the expected range of the usual targets.

Military
Known also as "battle zero", maximum point-blank range is crucial in the military. Soldiers are instructed to fire at any target within this range by simply placing their weapon's sights on the center of mass of the enemy target. Any errors in range estimation are effectively irrelevant, as a well-aimed shot will hit the torso of the enemy soldier. No height correction is needed at the "battle zero" or less distance; however, if it can result in a headshot or even a complete miss. The belt buckle is used as battle zero point of aim in Russian and former Soviet military doctrine.

The first mass-produced assault rifle, the World War II StG 44, and its preceding prototypes had iron sight lines elevated over the bore axis to extend point-blank range. The current trend for elevated sights and flatter shooting higher-velocity cartridges in assault rifles is in part due to a desire to further extend the maximum point-blank range, which makes the rifle easier to use. Raising the sight line  over the bore axis, introduces an inherent parallax problem as the projectile path crosses the horizontal sighting plane twice. The point closest to the gun occurs while the bullet is climbing through the line of sight and is called the near zero. The second point occurs as the projectile is descending through the line of sight. It is called the far zero. At closer ranges under the near zero range (typically inside ), the shooter must aim high to place shots where desired.

See also
 Table of handgun and rifle cartridges

Notes

References

 Nosworthy, Brent. marconibrenner. Constable and Co. Ltd, 1995

External links

 Tables for Cannon & Artillery Projectiles used in the American Civil War (includes point blank ranges).

Ballistics
Firearm terminology